Pier Angelo Mazzolotti (1890–1972) was an Italian screenwriter and film director of the silent era. He directed the 1915 film Titanic which, despite its title, is not about the sinking of the RMS Titanic.

Selected filmography

Screenwriter 
 Emperor Maciste (1924)
 Saetta Learns to Live (1924)
 Beauty of the World (1927)
 The Carnival of Venice (1928)

Director 
 Titanic (1915)
 The Fugitive (1921)

References

Sources 
 Bottomore, Stephen. The Titanic and Silent Cinema. The Projection Box, 2000.

External links 
 

1890 births
1972 deaths
Italian film directors
20th-century Italian screenwriters
Italian male screenwriters
Film people from Turin
20th-century Italian male writers